

Current broadcasters
Radio: KMOX AM 1120 (2011–present).
Cable TV: Bally Sports Midwest (1997–present).

Current announcers
Radio: John Rooney (since 2006) and Rick Horton (since 2016; Free TV 2001-2007, Cable TV 2008-2021).
Cable TV (152 games): Jim Edmonds (since 2016), Brad Thompson (since 2018), and Chip Caray (since 2023).

Past broadcasters
Radio: KWK AM 1380 (1928-1943); WEW AM 770 (1944-1948); WIL AM 1430 (1945-1947, 1949-1953); KXOK AM 630 (1954); KMOX AM 1120 (1926-1940, 1955-2005, 2011–present); KTRS AM 550 (2006-2010)
Television (Broadcast): KSD-TV/KSDK Channel 5 (1949-1987, 2007-2010); KPLR-TV 11 (1988-2006)
Television (Cable): SportsTime (1984); Cardinals Cable Network (1985-1989); Prime Sports Midwest (1994-1996)

Past announcers
Bill Wilkerson 
Bud Blattner (1960-1961)
Jim Bottomley (1939)
Jack Buck (1954-1959, 1961-2001)
Joe Buck (1991-2007)
Harry Caray (1945-1969)
Bob Carpenter (Cable TV 1984, 1994-1996; Free TV 1993-2005)
Dizzy Dean (1941-1946)
Joe Garagiola (c. 1955-1962)
Rich Gould (1998-1999)
George Grande (Free TV 1991-1992)
Jerry Gross (1961, 1963-1967)
Wayne Hagin (radio 2003-2005, Free TV 2006)
Milo Hamilton (1954)
Al Hrabosky (1985-2018)
Dan Kelly (1980-1984)
France Laux (1929-1943, 1945)
Gus Mancuso (1951-1953)
Garnett Marks (1927-1928)
Tim McCarver (2014-2019)
Dan McLaughlin (1999-2022),
Joel Meyers (2002)
Stretch Miller (1950-1953)
Johnny O'Hara (1936-1947)
Bob Ramsey (1997-1998, 2004)
Jay Randolph (1973-1987, 2007-2010)
Red Rush (1984)
Mike Shannon (1972-2021)
Ozzie Smith (1997-1999)
Bob Starr (1972-1979)
Gabby Street (1945-1950)
Mike Walden (1972)
Harry Walker (1973)
Ken Wilson (Cable and Free TV 1985-1990)
Jim Woods (1970-1971)

See also 
 List of current Major League Baseball announcers

References

External links
 www.stlradio.com - The Cardinals have a large embedded midwestern following due to radio broadcasting of games since 1926.
 St. Louis Cardinals : History : Cardinals All-Time Broadcasters

 
St. Louis Cardinals
Broadcasters
Prime Sports
Fox Sports Networks
Bally Sports
CBS Radio Sports